Pietro Bianchi (5 March 1883 – 1 July 1965) was an Italian gymnast who competed in the 1912 Summer Olympics and in the 1920 Summer Olympics. He was born in Milan. He was part of the Italian team, which won the gold medal in the gymnastics men's team, European system event in 1912 as well as in 1920. In the individual all-around competition in 1912 he finished sixth.

References

1883 births
1965 deaths
Gymnasts from Milan
Italian male artistic gymnasts
Gymnasts at the 1912 Summer Olympics
Gymnasts at the 1920 Summer Olympics
Olympic gymnasts of Italy
Olympic gold medalists for Italy
Olympic medalists in gymnastics
Medalists at the 1920 Summer Olympics
Medalists at the 1912 Summer Olympics